Mid Bedfordshire is a constituency represented in the House of Commons of the UK Parliament since 2005 by Nadine Dorries, of the Conservative Party. Apart from four early years, the constituency has returned a Conservative since its creation in 1918.

Constituency profile
This seat comprises small towns and rural areas, with the M1 motorway, Midland Main Line, A1 road (Great Britain), East Coast Main Line and other A roads providing the major north–south commuter links. There are several logistics sites including Amazon at Marston Gate. Residents are wealthier than the UK average and health is around the UK average.

History 
Mid Bedfordshire was created under the Representation of the People Act 1918.

It has elected Conservative MPs since 1931. It was held from 1983 to 1997 by the Attorney General (for the English, Welsh and Northern Irish aspects of the legal system and as advisor to HM Government) Sir Nicholas Lyell, who then transferred to the newly created seat of North East Bedfordshire; his old seat was won by Jonathan Sayeed, a former MP in Bristol. Sayeed was forced to retire in 2005 due to ill health, following a row over allegations he had profited from his private educational tours of Parliament and a resulting deselection attempt by the constituency party. Nadine Dorries has held the seat since, but the Conservative whip was withdrawn from her in 2012 and returned six months later, after she had appeared on I'm a Celebrity...Get Me Out of Here!. For the 2005 and 2010 elections the most successful opposition party candidate was a Liberal Democrat. However following their nationwide retreat in 2015, Labour once more occupies this position.

Boundaries and boundary changes 

1918–1950: The constituency was created as a Division of Bedfordshire by the Representation of the People Act 1918, comprising the Urban Districts of Ampthill, Biggleswade, and Leighton Buzzard, and the Rural Districts of Ampthill, Biggleswade, and Eaton Bray.

Ampthill and Biggleswade had been part of the abolished Biggleswade Division, and Leighton Buzzard was transferred from the Luton Division.

1950–1974: The Urban Districts of Ampthill, Biggleswade, and Sandy1, the Rural Districts of Ampthill and Biggleswade, and part of the Rural District of Bedford.

1Created as an Urban District from the Rural District of Biggleswade in 1927.

Gained southern and eastern rural areas of the County Constituency of Bedford.  Leighton Buzzard and surrounding rural areas (equivalent to the abolished Rural District of Eaton Bray, which had been absorbed by the Rural District of Luton) transferred to the new County Constituency of South Bedfordshire.

1974–1983: As above, apart from changes to the Rural District of Bedford.

The village of Eaton Socon had been absorbed by the Urban District of St Neots in Huntingdonshire and was transferred to the County Constituency thereof.

1983–1997: The District of Mid Bedfordshire wards of Ampthill, Arlesey, Biggleswade Ivel, Biggleswade Stratton, Blunham, Campton and Meppershall, Clifton and Henlow, Clophill, Haynes and Houghton Conquest, Langford, Maulden, Northill, Old Warden and Southill, Potton, Sandy All Saints, Sandy St Swithun's, Shefford, Shillington and Stondon, Stotfold, Wensley, and Wrest, and the Borough of North Bedfordshire wards of Eastcotts, Great Barford, Kempston East, Kempston Rural, Kempston West, Wilshamstead, and Wootton.

Kempston transferred from the abolished County Constituency of Bedford.  Parts included in the new County Constituencies of North Bedfordshire (far north-eastern area), South West Bedfordshire (south-western parts) and North Luton (including Flitwick).

1997–2010: The Borough of Bedford wards of Kempston Rural, Wilshamstead, and Wootton; the District of Mid Bedfordshire wards of Ampthill, Aspley Guise, Campton and Meppershall, Cranfield, Clifton and Henlow, Clophill, Flitton and Pulloxhill, Flitwick East, Flitwick West, Harlington, Haynes and Houghton Conquest, Marston, Maulden, Shefford, Shillington and Stondon, Westoning, Woburn, and Wrest; and the District of South Bedfordshire wards of Barton-le-Clay, Streatley, and Toddington.

Wholesale changes, with eastern parts, comprising about half of the electorate, including Biggleswade and Sandy, being transferred to the new County Constituency of North East Bedfordshire.  Kempston was transferred back to the re-established Borough Constituency of Bedford.  Regained parts of the District of Mid Bedfordshire previously transferred to South West Bedfordshire and North Luton (including Flitwick), together with the parts of the District of South Bedfordshire previously in North Luton.

2010–present: The Borough of Bedford wards of Turvey, Wilshamstead, and Wootton; the District of Mid Bedfordshire wards of Ampthill, Aspley Guise, Clifton and Meppershall, Cranfield, Flitton, Greenfield and Pulloxhill, Flitwick East, Flitwick West, Harlington, Houghton, Haynes, Southill and Old Warden, Marston, Maulden and Clophill, Shefford, Campton and Gravenhurst, Shillington, Stondon and Henlow Camp, Silsoe, Westoning and Tingrith, and Woburn; and the District of South Bedfordshire wards of Barton-le-Clay, Streatley, and Toddington.

Marginal changes due to revision of local authority wards.

Members of Parliament

Elections

Elections in the 2010s

In June 2015 the independent candidate, Tim Ireland, lodged an unsuccessful election petition accusing Nadine Dorries of breaches of section 106 of the Representation of the People Act 1983 by making false statements about his character. The petition was dismissed by the courts on 30 July 2015.

Elections in the 2000s

Elections in the 1990s

Elections in the 1980s

Elections in the 1970s

Elections in the 1960s

Elections in the 1950s

Elections in the 1940s

General Election 1939–40:
Another General Election was required to take place before the end of 1940. The political parties had been making preparations for an election to take place from 1939 and by the end of this year, the following candidates had been selected; 
Conservative: Alan Lennox-Boyd
Labour: George Matthews
Liberal: Dr Leonard T M Gray

Election in the 1930s

Election in the 1920s

Election in the 1910s

See also 
 List of parliamentary constituencies in Bedfordshire

Notes

References

Parliamentary constituencies in Bedfordshire
Constituencies of the Parliament of the United Kingdom established in 1918
Flitwick
Ampthill
Biggleswade